Avdotyino is a rural locality (a village) in Semyonovskoye Rural Settlement, Stupinsky District, Moscow Oblast, Russia. The population was 7 as of 2010. There are 8 streets.

Geography 
The village is located on the right tributary of the Lopasnya River near villages Semyonovskoe, Myshenskoe and Kolychevo, 41 km northwest of Stupino (the district's administrative centre) by road. Semyonovskoye is the nearest rural locality.

References 

Rural localities in Stupinsky District